Independence Day in Uganda is a state holiday celebrated on October 9 every year. It celebrates Uganda's independence from the United Kingdom in 1962.

History 
Explorer Henry Stanley discovered Uganda in 1875 which was divided into two kingdoms at the time. 
In 1888, Uganda came under the control of the British East Africa Company. After World War II, native Ugandans were allowed to serve in government, and by 1955, half the members of the legislative council were Ugandans. The Ugandan Constitutional Conference was held in London in September 1961, was organised to pave the way for Ugandan independence. At the end of the conference in on October 9, Uganda officially became an independent nation.

Celebrations 

Celebrations are held throughout Uganda and activities are designed to promote the nation. Performances are held by well-known artists. There are also cultural demonstrations that include traditional festivals. In 2017, Uganda celebrated their 55th anniversary of Independence.

Trooping of the Colour and military parade 

A military parade is held annually at the Kololo Ceremonial Grounds in Kampala. The ceremony normally begins at 10:30 after the arrival of the President of Uganda. The president then takes the national salute while "Oh Uganda, Land of Beauty" is played by the massed bands. The President of Uganda then inspects of guard of honour. After the inspection is finished, the band plays a slow march followed with a quick march as the lone drummer then breaks away to take his position beside number one guard to play the drummers call, signalling to the officers of guard of honour to take positions to receive the colour.
 
The escort for the colour then marches off to receive the colour which is located in the center of the Ceremonial Grounds. 3 officers then retrieve the colour and order the escort to the colour to presents arms for the national salute (The first verse of the Ugandan national anthem). Then the escort for the colour marches off in a slow march to the tune of the British Grenadier Guards. After the guardsman get back in their positions, the president then begins the inspection of the whole parade. The national colours are then raised on the main flagpole.

The president then delivers a holiday address and following the address, religious leaders then take to the central podium to pray for the nation. The parade commander then orders the parade to begin with a slow march, followed by a quick march.

See also 
 Public holidays in Uganda
 Trooping the Colour

References

Videos 
 Uganda Celebrates 55 years of Independence

Uganda
Ugandan culture